The 2009–10 LFL Season was the inaugural season of the Lingerie Football League. The league was formed from a concept called the Lingerie Bowl, that was featured during half-time of the Super Bowl. The season featured 10 teams in cities across the United States. The season kicked off on September 4, 2009, and culminated with Lingerie Bowl VII on February 7, 2010. The championship game, scheduled to coincide with Super Bowl XLIV, was held at the Seminole Hard Rock Hotel and Casino in Hollywood, Florida. The Western Conference Los Angeles Temptation defeated the Eastern Conference Chicago Bliss by the score of 27–14.

The games were released on DVD in Australia by FuelTV, who aired the games in Australia. The games were divided into three sets, labeled Western, Eastern, and Playoffs.

Teams
When the operators of the Lingerie Bowl announced the formation of a full season league in September 2008, they included the names of ten teams for the 2009–10 season: the Atlanta Steam, Chicago Bliss, Dallas Desire, Los Angeles Temptation, Miami Caliente, New England Euphoria, Phoenix Scorch, San Diego Seduction, Seattle Mist, and the Tampa Breeze. Four of the teams (Los Angeles, Miami, Phoenix, and Tampa) were to take part in the 2009 Lingerie Bowl, but it was cancelled due to venue issues. By February 2009, the Euphoria were removed and the league was listing 11 possible team locations by adding Charlotte, North Carolina, and Denver, Colorado. The league then added the New York Majesty and Philadelphia Passion as teams, while the teams in Atlanta, Charlotte, and Phoenix never launched. The Majesty were originally scheduled with the intentions of using Nassau Veterans Memorial Coliseum on Long Island, New York, for its two home games, but failed to secure the lease leading to its first home game being postponed. The team eventually scheduled home games over 100 miles from New York City in Reading, Pennsylvania.

Schedule

Standings

Eastern Conference

Western Conference

 – clinched playoff berth

Playoffs

Awards
League MVP
 Gabrielle Marie, Dallas Desire

Offensive Player of the Year
 Saran Dunmore, Chicago Bliss

Defensive Player of the Year 
 Elizabeth Gorman, Tampa Breeze

Coach of the Year 
 Antuan Edwards, Dallas Desire

Mortaza Award
 Erin Marie Garrett, Dallas Desire

Most Improved Player
 Riley Maddex, Los Angeles Temptation

References

Lingerie Football League
Legends Football League
LFL season